Leticia Gómez-Tagle (born in Mexico City) is a Mexican pianist and piano teacher. She has been teaching in Linz, Austria, since 1999.

Biography 
Leticia Gómez-Tagle received her first academic training in Mexico, where her professors were mainly Manuel Delaflor for piano and Angel Esteva Loyola for music theory.

She has won several prizes at youth piano competitions in Mexico, including the University of Puebla, and was awarded 1st prize at the Fomento Musical Sala Chopin, through which she received a scholarship from the Austrian governmental ministry and was thus able to take up studies in piano concert performance and instrumental pedagogy with Prof. Michael Krist at the Vienna Academy of Music. She also received further musical impulses in Vienna from Prof. Carlos Rivera and in master classes with Paul Badura-Skoda, Jörg Demus, György Sándor and Orlando Otey.

Since her participation at the International Chopin Piano Competition in Warsaw in 1990, she has performed regularly at various music festivals in Mexico and Europe. She has been invited by the Mexican Foreign Ministry to perform in the USA, Canada and Lebanon.

As a soloist, she has performed with numerous orchestras at home and abroad, including the Orquesta Filarmónica de México, Orquesta Sinfónica del IPN (Mexico), Orquesta Filarmónica de Querétaro, Symphonic Orchestra of the Music School Linz, and the Chamber Orchestra with members of the Bruckner Orchestra Linz under the direction of conductors such as Ingo Ingensand, Jesús Medina, Benjamín Juárez Echenique and Guadalupe Flores.

She has given master classes in Spain (Mallorca, Córdoba and Granada), Mexico (CENART University) and Lebanon at the Sin el-Fil Conservatory. Since 1999 she has been teaching at the Music School of the City of Linz.

Recordings 

 2010: "Dos Continentes", scherzi by Chopin and Latin American works by Piazzola, Ginastera, Moleiro, and Hugo Gómez Tagle among others (Urtext)
 2016: "Dance Passion", works by Liszt, Chopin, Brahms, de Falla, Albéniz, Ginastera, and Márquez among others (ARS Produktion)
 2017: "Poems & Pictures", Gaspard de la Nuit by Ravel, Pictures at an Exhibition by Mussorgsky, two transcriptions by Schubert / Liszt (ARS Produktion)
 2019: "Sí! Sonatas", Piano Sonata No. 3 in B minor, Op. 58 by Chopin, Piano Sonata in B minor by Liszt and Piano Sonata in B minor, K. 87 by Domenico Scarlatti (ARS Produktion)

Publications 

 Arturo Márquez: Danzón No. 2, transcription for solo piano (Hamburg: Peermusic Classical, 2016).

References

External links 

 Official website of Leticia Gómez-Tagle
 Biography on ARS Produktion
 Leticia Gómez-Tagle on Facebook
 Leticia Gómez-Tagle on Instagram

Mexican musicians
Mexican pianists
Year of birth missing (living people)
Living people